RKS Radomsko is an association football club based in the city of Radomsko, in the south of Poland. Their home stadium is Stadion RKS. Currently, they compete in the IV liga group Łódź.

History
Established in 1979, the club has played most of it history in the Polish Fourth League, though in 1993, the club advanced to the Polish Third League, and to the Polish Second League in 1995.

RKS Radomsko's most notable achievements is reaching the  top division in 2001, where they played considerably well in the first half of the season.  In 2003 the club made it to the semi-final of the Polish Cup, although the club has since hit harder times and, in 2005, experienced relegation from the Polish Second League.

Notable players
The club is known for the establishment of the Polish former international Jacek Krzynówek.

Rivalries
Their biggest rivals are GKS Bełchatów mostly due to the close proximity of the two clubs and many years spent in the same divisions.

References 

 
Association football clubs established in 1979
1979 establishments in Poland
Football clubs in Łódź Voivodeship